The Journal of African American Studies is a peer-reviewed academic journal that publishes papers in the field of African American studies. The journal is edited by Judson L. Jeffries (Ohio State University) and published quarterly by Springer.

Abstracting and indexing 
The journal is abstracted and indexed in the Emerging Sources Citation Index, Scopus, Academic Search Premier, IBZ Online, Social services abstracts, and Sociological abstracts.

The journal has a 2019 SCImago Journal Rank of 0.174.

References

External links 
 

Black studies publications
English-language journals
Ethnic studies journals
Quarterly journals
Sociology journals
Springer Publishing academic journals